Darren Simon Harland (born 15 October 1979, Whitby, Yorkshire, England) is an English cricketer.  Harland is a right-handed batsman.

Harland represented the Yorkshire Cricket Board in List A cricket.  His debut List A match came against the Gloucestershire Cricket Board in the second round of the 2002 Cheltenham & Gloucester Trophy which was held in 2001.  From 2001 to 2002, he represented the Board in four List A matches, the last of which came against Northumberland in the second round of the 2003 Cheltenham & Gloucester Trophy which was played in 2002.  In his four List A matches, he scored 38 runs at a batting average of 9.50, with a high score of 16.  In the field he took two catches.

He currently plays club cricket for Scarborough, in the Yorkshire ECB County Premier League.

References

External links
Darren Harland at Cricinfo
Darren Harland at CricketArchive

1979 births
Living people
People from Whitby
Cricketers from Yorkshire
Yorkshire Cricket Board cricketers